The Rabbit Hill Historic District is a historic district roughly bounded by Highland, Main, Franklin, and Milford Streets in Medway, Massachusetts. Most of the residential properties in the district are Federal or Greek Revival in character.

The district was added to the National Register of Historic Places in 1988.

See also
National Register of Historic Places listings in Norfolk County, Massachusetts

References

Historic districts in Norfolk County, Massachusetts
National Register of Historic Places in Norfolk County, Massachusetts
Historic districts on the National Register of Historic Places in Massachusetts
Medway, Massachusetts